We Should Have Never Lived Like We Were Skyscrapers is the debut studio album of the indie pop band Chin Up Chin Up. The album, released October 13, 2004, is notable in that before its completion, bassist Chris Saathoff was killed in hit and run accident.

Track listing 
 "Why is My Sleeping Bag a Ghetto Muppet?" – 2:33
 "We Should Have Never Lived Like We Were Skyscrapers" – 4:37
 "Falcons and Vulcans" – 5:30
 "Virginia, Don't Drown" – 3:52
 "Collide the Tide" – 3:55
 "I Hope for Tumbleweeds" – 3:25
 "The Architect Has a Gun" – 4:17
 "Get Me Off This Fucking Island" – 3:37
 "I'll Be Your Avalanche" – 3:41
 "All My Hammocks are Dying" – 3:25

References

2004 debut albums
Chin Up Chin Up albums